Solntsevsky District is an administrative and municipal district (raion), one of the twenty-eight in Kursk Oblast, Russia. It is located in the south of the oblast. Its administrative center is the urban locality (a work settlement) of Solntsevo. As of the 2021 Census, the total population of the district was 12,182, with the population of Solntsevo accounting for 29.7% of that number.

History
The district was established on June 16, 1928.

References

Notes

Sources

Districts of Kursk Oblast
States and territories established in 1928
